Jacob Appel may refer to:

 Jacob M. Appel (born 1973), American author, bioethicist and social critic
 Jacob Appel (painter) (1680–1751), Dutch painter
 Jacob Appel, field economist and co-author of More Than Good Intentions